Gordon Thomas may refer to:

Gordon Thomas (author) (1933–2017), Welsh author
Gordon Thomas (American football), American college football coach
Gordon Thomas (outsider musician), singer/songwriter/jazz trombonist
Typeface (comics), a fictional Marvel Comics antihero
Gordon Thomas (cyclist) (1921–2013), British Olympic cyclist
Gordon Thomas (politician) (1914–1997), mayor of East Lansing, Michigan

See also
Thomas Gordon (disambiguation)